Brian Barker was a British political activist and journalist.

Barker worked as a journalist in France, Germany, and the Netherlands prior to World War II.  He was expelled from Germany because of his opposition to Nazism.

On returning to the UK, Barker became active in the Labour Party, standing unsuccessfully in the 1937 London County Council election, and in Chertsey at the 1945 United Kingdom general election.  He also joined the Fabian Society, and served on its executive committee for several years in the 1940s.  In 1946, he wrote Labour in London: A Study in Municipal Achievement.

References

Year of birth missing
Year of death missing
Labour Party (UK) parliamentary candidates
Members of the Fabian Society
British journalists